Knattspyrnudeild Keflavíkur is an Icelandic football team, commonly known as Keflavík.  It is a subdivision of Keflavík ÍF (Keflavík, íþrótta- og ungmennafélag), based in the town of Reykjanesbær in Iceland. They play at Nettó-völlur in Keflavík.

Competition history
Keflavík have played in the Icelandic football league since 1956.  The team has also taken part in every year of the Icelandic FA Cup as well as several minor competitions, including the League Cup.  Keflavík has played in all the major European competitions, the European Cup, the UEFA Cup, the Cup Winners' Cup and the Intertoto Cup.

League history

1956–57: Division 2
1958–60: Division 1
1961–62: Division 2
1963–80: Division 1
1981: Division 2
1982–89: Division 1
1990–92: Division 2
1993–02: Division 1 (Renamed Premier League in 1997)
2003: Division 1
2004–15: Premier League
2016–17: Division 1
2018: Premier League
2019-2020: Division 1
2021: Premier League

Keflavík first played league football when the team joined the newly formed second division in 1956.  Keflavík was promoted in 1957 and played in the top flight from 1958 to 1960.  The team returned to the second division in 1961 but were promoted again the following year.  After narrowly avoiding relegation in 1963 Keflavík won its first title in 1964.  The team also won the title in 1969, 1971 and 1973.  Since then the team has mostly played in Iceland's top division, Úrvalsdeild, with four spells in the second tier (1981, 1990–92, 2003 and 2016–17.)

Cup history
The Icelandic FA Cup was established in 1960 and Keflavík entered from the beginning.  The team's first cup game ended in a 0–6 defeat by ÍA.  Keflavík reached the semi-final of the competition the next three years and had reached seven semis before playing for the first time in the final in 1973.  That game ended in a 1–2 defeat by Fram.  In 1975 Keflavík won the cup for the first time, beating ÍA by a single goal.  The team reached the final again in 1982, 1985, 1988 and 1993 but lost each time.  The duck was broken in 1997 when ÍBV were beaten in a penalty-shootout in a replay.  Keflavík won the FA Cup again in 2004 and 2006, first by beating KA 3–0 and then KR 2–0.

European history
Keflavík played its first European game in 1965 after becoming champions the previous year.  The team were drawn against Hungarian side Ferencváros in the European Cup.  The Hungarians won 9–1 and 4–1 for a 13–2 aggregate win.  In the early 1970s Keflavík were the envy of other Icelandic teams when they were drawn against several top sides, including Everton in 1970, Tottenham Hotspur in 1971 and Real Madrid in 1972.  Keflavík's first win in European competition came against Swedish side Kalmar FF in the 1979–80 UEFA Cup.  Keflavík won the home match 1–0 and progressed to the second round for the first time, winning on away goals.  Keflavík played in the UEFA Europa League in 2009–10 after finishing 2nd in the Icelandic Premier League in 2008 and lost to Maltese club Valletta with the aggregate favoring the Maltese 5–2.

UEFA club competition record

European competition

Team colours
The Keflavík football team originally played in black shirts and white shorts. In 1973, the team changed its strip to yellow shirts and blue shorts. One reason given for the change was the memory of the team's first European away match, against Ferencváros in Budapest. The Keflavík players were playing in floodlights for the first time and had trouble spotting each other in their black shirts.

In 2014 through 2016 Keflavik played in black and white home jerseys and an all-white away jersey in honor of their 100th anniversary.

Achievements
Úrvalsdeild karla (Icelandic Championships): 4
  1964, 1969, 1971, 1973
Icelandic Cups: 4
  1975, 1997, 2004, 2006
Icelandic Super Cups: 6
  1970, 1972, 1973, 1975, 1976, 1998

Management

Club officials

Coaching staff

Source:

Board

Former coaches

 Hafsteinn Guðmundsson (1956–60)
 Albert Guðmundsson (1960)
 Högni Gunnlaugsson (1961–62)
 Guðbjörn Jónsson (1962–63)
 Óli B. Jónsson (1964–65)
 Reynir Karlsson (1966)
 Ríkharður Jónsson (1967)
 Reynir Karlsson (1968)
 Hólmbert Friðjónsson (1969–70)
 Einar Helgason (1971–72)
 Joe Hooley (1973)
 George Smith (1974)
 Joe Hooley (1975)
 Guðni Kjartansson &  Jón Jóhannsson (1975)
 James Craig (1976)
 Guðni Kjartansson (1976)
 Hólmbert Friðjónsson (1977)
 Guðni Kjartansson (1978)
 Ron Smith (1979)
 Kjartan Sigtryggsson (1979)
 Tommy Tranter (1979)
 Guðni Kjartansson (1979)
 John McKernan (1980)
 Guðni Kjartansson (1981)
 Karl Hermannsson (1982)
 Guðni Kjartansson (1983)
 Haukur Hafsteinsson (1984)
 Hólmbert Friðjónsson (1985–86)
 Peter Keeling (1987)
 Frank Upton (1987–88)
 Ástráður Gunnarsson (1989)
 Hólmbert Friðjónsson (1989)
 Þorsteinn Ólafsson (1990)
 Kjartan Másson (1991–93)
 Ian Ross (1994)
 Pétur Pétursson (1994)
 Ingi Björn Albertsson (1995)
 Þórir Sigfússon (1995)
 Kjartan Masson (1996)
 Sigurður Björgvinsson &  Gunnar Oddsson (1997–99)
 Kjartan Másson (1999)
 Páll Guðlaugsson (2000)
 Gunnar Oddsson (2000)
 Gústav Adolf Björnsson (2001)
 Kjartan Másson (2002)
 Milan Janković (1 Jan 2003 – 31 Dec 2004)
 Guðjón Þórðarson (Pre-season 2005 – 17 May 2005)
 Kristján Guðmundsson (1 May 2005 – 31 Dec 2009)
 Willum Þór Þórsson (20 Feb 2010 – 31 Dec 2011)
 Zoran Daníel Ljubičić (1 Jan 2012 – 19 June 2013)
 Kristján Guðmundsson (19 June 2013 – 5 June 2015)
 Þorvaldur Örlygsson (10 October 2015–4 October 2016)
 Guðlaugur Baldursson (10 October 2016–)

Players

Current squad

Player records
All current players are in bold.

Most league appearances

Most league goals

Stadium information
Name – Nettó-völlurinn
City – Keflavík, Reykjanesbær
Capacity –  5,200
Built – 1968

Shirt Sponsors

References

External links
Official website
 IcelandFootball.net – Keflavík ÍF 

 
Football clubs in Iceland
Association football clubs established in 1929
1929 establishments in Iceland
Keflavík ÍF

it:Keflavík ÍF
he:מועדון הכדורגל קפלוויק